Savannah Elizabeth McCaskill (born July 31, 1996) is an American soccer player who plays as a midfielder for Angel City FC of the National Women's Soccer League (NWSL) and the United States national team.

Early life
McCaskill was raised in Chapin, South Carolina, where she attended Irmo High School. She was twice-named to the All-State team and was the team's highest-scoring player in 2012 with 33 goals. As a senior, she was ranked by Top Drawer Soccer in the top 100 players  and top 20 midfielders nationwide.

McCaskill played club soccer for CESA 95 in the Elite Clubs National League (ECNL) and captained the team. She played for the South Carolina Olympic Development Program (ODP) team from 2008 to 2012 and the regional ODP team from 2010 to 2013.

Collegiate career
McCaskill attended the University of South Carolina where she played for the Gamecocks from 2014 to 2017. As a freshman, she started in all 25 matches and tied for the most points (15) on the team playing as a forward (though initially recruited as a defender). She was named as Freshman of the Year by the Southeastern Conference (SEC) and was named to the conference's second-team and all-freshman teams.

As a sophomore starting in all 25 games, McCaskill led the team in points and goals (29 and 10 respectively) while her nine assists ranked second. She ranked in the top five in the SEC for points and assists per game as well as total assists. She was named to the All-SEC First Team, NSCAA All-South Region First Team and was voted the team's Offensive Player of the Year.

In 2016, McCaskill's 45 points and 17 goals set new school records for a single season. Her ten game-winning goals ranked second in Division 1 and first in the SEC. She was named the SEC's Offensive Player of the Week in early September. She scored a hat-trick against Tulsa in August marking the first time one had been scored by a player on the team since 2010.

Club career

Sky Blue, 2018–2019
McCaskill was selected by the Boston Breakers as the number two overall pick at the 2018 NWSL College Draft. After the team folded due to failed buyout negotiations in late January, McCaskill was selected by Sky Blue FC with the second pick in the 2018 NWSL Dispersal Draft. She scored her first career goal on April 21 against the Chicago Red Stars. McCaskill was a finalist for 2018 NWSL Rookie of the Year, alongside Andi Sullivan and Imani Dorsey.

McCaskill made six appearances for Sky Blue in 2019.

Loan to Sydney FC
McCaskill signed with Sydney FC for the 2018-19 W-League season, joining fellow Americans Sofia Huerta, Danielle Colaprico and Aubrey Bledsoe in Sydney.

McCaskill scored her first goal for Sydney FC in a 5–2 win over Adelaide United in December 2018, before scoring a brace the following month against Newcastle Jets in a 3–1 win.

Sydney FC advanced to the 2019 W-League Grand Final, Sydney won 4–2. McCaskill scored two goals and recorded an assist, she was named Player of the Match award for her performance.

Chicago Red Stars, 2019–2020
On June 19, 2019, McCaskill was traded to the Chicago Red Stars in exchange for a first and second round draft pick at the 2020 NWSL College Draft. McCaskill made her Red Stars debut on June 23, 2019, in a game where the Red Stars played Reign FC. McCaskill scored her first goal for the Red Stars in a 3–0 win over the Houston Dash.

Racing Louisville, 2021
Before the 2021 Season Chicago traded McCaskill as well as Yuki Nagasato's rights to Racing Louisville FC as well as a 2021 International Roster spot and the No. 5 overall pick in the 2021 NWSL Draft. McCaskill made her debut for Louisville on April 10, 2021, in their first game. She scored her first goal against her former team, Chicago Red Stars in a 3–0 win.

Angel City, 2022
After the 2021 Season McCaskill was traded to Angel City FC in exchange for the No. 6 pick in the 2022 NWSL Draft and $25,000 in allocation money. Louisville later traded that pick to North Carolina Courage for Jessica McDonald.

International career
McCaskill has represented the United States on the under-23 national team and was nominated for U.S. Soccer's 2017 Young Female Athlete of the Year award. She made her debut for the senior national team on January 21, 2018, during an international friendly against Denmark. McCaskill was named to the U.S. roster for the 2018 SheBelieves Cup. She appeared in all three games as the United States won the tournament for the second time.

On August 23, 2018, she was named to the United States U-23 team for the 2018 Nordic tournament.

McCaskill was named to the provisional U.S. Roster for the 2018 CONCACAF Women's Championship but she was not named to the final 20-player squad.

Honors

Club
 W-League Championship: 2018–19

International
USWNT
SheBelieves Cup: 2018

References

External links
 U.S. Soccer player profile
 
 

1996 births
Living people
NJ/NY Gotham FC players
National Women's Soccer League players
American women's soccer players
South Carolina Gamecocks women's soccer players
Boston Breakers draft picks
United States women's international soccer players
Soccer players from South Carolina
People from Chapin, South Carolina
Women's association football forwards
Chicago Red Stars players
Sydney FC (A-League Women) players
Expatriate women's soccer players in Australia
American expatriate women's soccer players
American expatriate sportspeople in Australia
Sportspeople from Columbia, South Carolina
Racing Louisville FC players
Angel City FC players